Polyolester oil (POE oil) is a type of synthetic oil used in refrigeration compressors that is compatible with the refrigerants R-134a, R-410A and R-12. HFC-134a with POE oil as the lubricant is a replacement for CFC-12 with mineral oil as the lubricant. as HFC-134a does not mix well with mineral oil. These wax-free oils are suggested for use with chlorine free HFC systems as they provide better lubrication and stability and are more miscible with HFC refrigerants. They can meet the lubricity requirements to those of mineral oils used with CFCs and HFCs. They are compatible with most lubricants in the market. It is noted that the viscosity of the oil decreases with temperature. The dispersion behavior of this oil has also been the subject of a lot of study. It is also considered by some to be a good additive to engine oil.

Use
As the types of refrigerant gases used in AC and refrigeration equipment change, often due to the ozone-depleting or global warming characteristics of older refrigerants, the type of oil used in these systems sometimes must change as well to match the new refrigerants. POE oils are very good solvents and easily dissolve most residual mineral oils that they may be replacing. So even though, small amounts of the old oil may remain, it won't clog the system. 

Polyolester oil is used exclusively in jet turbine engines and often used in moving picture film cameras.

Problems
However, the same properties that make it a good solvent for oils also make it a good solvent for undesired things left behind during the manufacturing of a unit: dust, dirt, residue from soldering, small bits of metal from cutting, and oxidized metal from the tubing. The residues collected can clog the system filters and cause excessive wear or damage to critical components such as the vanes or valves.  This aspect makes it more important to check that components are machined properly, deburred, and cleaned.  Another problem with these oils is that they are hygroscopic in nature, which means they can absorb moisture from the atmosphere. Hence, technicians working with units that have to be opened, should leave the unit open for as little time as required.
In addition, POE oils typically have lower viscosity indexes than PAG or PAO oils, so that a higher viscosity grade is required in order to attain a certain kinematic viscosity at higher oil temperatures.

References

Non-petroleum based lubricants